The Church of Saint Giles is a church in Prague, Czech Republic. This monumental three-aisled church was built on the foundations of a Romanesque church. Subsequently, numerous reconstructions took place during the 12th to 14th century. The Church of St. Giles in Prague was consecrated on 4 May 1371.
In 1625, the church was donated to the Dominican order, which has served here and in the adjacent monastery ever since. The church was remodeled in Baroque style.

References

External links

 

Churches in Prague
Old Town (Prague)